Coping is the process of managing stressful circumstances.

Coping may also refer to:
 Coping (architecture), consists of the capping or covering of a wall
 Coping (joinery), a woodworking technique
 A coping is the part of a Crown, that contacts the prepared tooth

fr:Stress chez l'humain#Les stratégies de coping et stratégies d’ajustement